Afghanistan participated at the 2017 Summer Universiade in Taipei, Taiwan with 3 competitors in 2 sports, swimming and wushu.

Competitors 
The following table lists Afghanistan's delegation per sport and gender.

Swimming 

Men

Wushu 

One Afghan wushu practitioner, Mohammad Hasib Mohsini, competed in the men's sanda (Chinese kickboxing) 60 kg event. He was defeated in the first match by Lucas Luciano Queiroz Pereira of Brazil, who won both rounds.

Men's sanda

References
Results

Nations at the 2017 Summer Universiade
2017 in Afghan sport